CGAC may refer to:
China General Aviation Corporation -  A former Chinese airline
 Galicia Contemporary Art Centre - A museum in Galicia
 CGA Computer - A software security company whose flagship product, Top Secret, was acquired by  Computer Associates in 1985